CJ Jones (born September 29, 1950) is an American actor residing in Los Angeles. He is one of the subjects of See What I'm Saying: The Deaf Entertainers Documentary (2009). Jones made his feature film debut with Edgar Wright's Baby Driver (2017), in which he portrays Joseph, the deaf foster father of Ansel Elgort's protagonist.

He has developed three one-man shows that have toured the United States, Japan, Sweden, Australia, Ecuador, and Canada. He co-wrote and directed six classic fairy tales for children's television for the series Once Upon a Sign. CJ produced the International Sign Language Theater Festival, which hosted theater artists from all over the world. He has also appeared in various episodes of American TV series.

Jones created a Na'vi sign language for Avatar: The Way of Water, in which he plays a Na'vi.

Personal life
CJ Jones is the son of deaf parents who communicated in American Sign Language. One of seven hearing children born to the couple, he lost his hearing at the age of 7 when he fell ill with spinal meningitis. He attended Missouri School for the Deaf. Active in sports, he was voted class valedictorian. He remains active in deaf awareness causes and charities.

Filmography

Film

Television

References

External links 
 CJ Jones official website
 
 See What I'm Saying official website

1950 births
Living people
American male deaf actors
American male film actors
Male actors from St. Louis
Deaf activists